Spirit of Music is a 1999 studio album by Ziggy Marley and the Melody Makers. It was the group's final album before their initial split in order to pursue solo careers. The album peaked at No. 1 for Top Reggae Albums chart. Unlike their previous albums, it was not nominated for a Grammy

Critical reception

Rosalind Cummings-Yeates of AllMusic concludes his review with, "Filled with soulful singing and easygoing melodies, this album is a must-have for even casual reggae fans."

Gus Bode of the Daily Egyptian begins his review of the album with, "Spirit of Music is like a comfortable, close friend. It sympathetically assures you it always will be by your side, no matter what circumstances arrive, while also encouraging you to live life to its fullest potential."

Track listing

References 

Ziggy Marley and the Melody Makers albums
1999 albums
Albums produced by Don Was
Elektra Records albums